USS Sparrow (AMc-31) was a coastal minesweeper acquired by the U.S. Navy for the dangerous task of removing mines from minefields laid in the water to prevent ships from passing.

World War II service 

The purse seiner Pacific was acquired by the Navy on November 14, 1940 at San Diego, California. Fifteen days later, she was assigned the name Sparrow, and designated a coastal minesweeper, AMC-31.

Reclassified harbor tug 

On December 12, 1940, she was reclassified as a harbor tug, and the name Sparrow was cancelled. On February 5, 1941, she was named Marin, and redesignated a net tender, YN-53.

References

External links 
 NavSource Online: Mine Warfare Vessel Photo Archive - Marin (YNT 21) - ex-YN-53 - ex-Sparrow (AMc 31)

Ships built in San Diego
1929 ships
Minesweepers of the United States Navy
World War II minesweepers of the United States
Ships present during the attack on Pearl Harbor